Nader Abd-Elmaksoud Fergany is an Egyptian sociologist and economist. He is director of the Egyptian research center Al-Mishkat.

Life 
Fergany was born on August 20, 1944, in Giza. He obtained his bachelors degree in 1963 at the faculty of Economics and Political science of Cairo University. He continued his study at the University of North Carolina and received his Ph.D. there in 1970.

Fergany published in the field of demography, migration, labor market, education and development, in Egypt and other Arab countries.

He effectuated research for a great number of Egyptian and international institutes. He is advisor for many Arab and international organizations, like the National Planning Institute, the National Population Council, the Central Agency for Mobilization and Statistics and the American University, all in Cairo. Furthermore, he did research for the Arab Institute for Training and Research in Statistics in Baghdad, the Arab Planning Institute in Kuwait and St Antony's College in Oxford in the UK.

Bibliography 
Fergany is the principal author of the Arab Human Development Report of 2002. This report was honored in 2003 with a Prince Claus Award from the Netherlands and was the first of a series of reports in this field that followed in subsequent years. These reports were labored by a great number of scientists. Furthermore, he published (selection):

1974: An introduction to demographic analysis
1975: The relationship between fertility level and societal development: And implications for planning to reduce fertility: an exercise in macro-statistical modelling
1981: The role of Egyptian labour in the construction sector in Kuwait
1987: Differentials in labour migration, Egypt (1974-1984)
1981: Monitoring the condition of the poor in the third world: Some aspects of measurement
2001: Human development and the acquisition of advanced knowledge in Arab countries : the role of higher education, research and technological development

References 

20th-century Egyptian economists
Egyptian sociologists
Academics from Cairo
Living people
1944 births
People from Giza
21st-century Egyptian economists